The Navy Bomb Disposal School , was a World War II era U.S. naval training installation built on American University property in Washington, D.C.

Environmental impact
During World War II, American University allowed the U.S. Navy to use part of its campus for bomb disposal training. In 1993, a construction worker stumbled upon some of the buried munitions. This led to major cleanup efforts in the 1990s and 2000s (decade) on the site, which included a corner of the university and several neighboring residences.

References

1942 establishments in Washington, D.C.
1945 disestablishments in Washington, D.C.
Closed installations of the United States Navy
Explosive ordnance disposal units and formations
History of American University
Military installations closed in 1945
United States home front during World War II
World War II sites in the United States